Chester P. Majewski (1928-1983) was an American politician who served as a Democratic member of the Illinois House of Representatives and a Commissioner of the Metropolitan Water Reclamation District of Greater Chicago.

Biographical sketch
Majewski was born March 9, 1928, in Chicago. He attended high school at Steinmetz High School. He earned a Bachelor of Science from Northwestern University in 1952 and a Juris Doctor from Northwestern University Law School in 1956. He served overseas in the United States Army in the Far East Command's 25th Infantry Division. He reached the rank of sergeant. During his legal career, he was assistant corporation counsel for the City of Chicago and an assistant public defender for Cook County, Illinois, including in Appeals Division. He was elected as one of 118 at-large members to the Illinois House of Representatives. He was a member of the Committees on Education, Insurance and Revenue. He was elected to the board of commissioners of the Metropolitan Water Reclamation District of Greater Chicago in 1968 and re-elected in 1974 and 1980. He died July 9, 1983.

References

1928 births
1983 deaths
20th-century American politicians
Illinois lawyers
Democratic Party members of the Illinois House of Representatives
Military personnel from Chicago
Northwestern University alumni
Northwestern University Pritzker School of Law alumni
Politicians from Chicago
20th-century American lawyers
Public defenders